Tschagguns is a village in the Montafon valley, Bludenz district in the Austrian state of Vorarlberg. Tschagguns offers skiing with its own ski resort called Golm. Tschagguns offers hiking, mountain biking, winter sports and much more. Gauertal is a valley found in Tschagguns between Mittagspitze and Golm. It is famous for the "3 Türme" which means 3 Towers.

Population

Sons and daughters of the place

 Werner Bleiner (born 1946), ski racer
 Christian Orlainsky (born 1962), ski racer

Persons with reference to the place
 Georg Friedrich Haas (born 1953 in Graz), composer, has grown up in Tschagguns

Honorary citizen
 Arnold Durig (1872-1961), physiologist

References

Cities and towns in Bludenz District